Both immigrant Poles and Americans of Polish heritage live in Chicago, Illinois. They are a part of worldwide Polonia, the Polish term for the Polish Diaspora outside of Poland. Poles in Chicago have contributed to the economic, social and cultural well-being of Chicago from its very beginning. Poles have been a part of the history of Chicago since 1837, when Captain Joseph Napieralski, along with other veterans of the November Uprising first set foot there. As of the 2000 U.S. census, Poles in Chicago were the largest European American ethnic group in the city, making up 7.3% of the total population. However, according to the 2006–2008 American Community Survey, German Americans and Irish Americans each had slightly surpassed Polish Americans as the largest European American ethnic groups in Chicago. German Americans made up 7.3% of the population, and numbered at 199,789; Irish Americans also made up 7.3% of the population, and numbered at 199,294. Polish Americans now made up 6.7% of Chicago's population, and numbered at 182,064. Polish is the third most widely spoken language in Chicago behind English and Spanish.

History
A number of Poles contributed to the history of the city together with Captain Napieralski, a veteran of Cross Mountain during the November Uprising. Along with him came other early Polish settlers such as Major Louis Chlopicki, the nephew of General Józef Chłopicki who had been the leader of the same insurrection. Not to mention certain A. Panakaske (Panakaski) who resided in the second ward in the 1830s as well as J. Zoliski who lived in the sixth ward with records of both men having cast their ballots for William B. Ogden in the 1837 mayoral race in Chicago.

Distribution
According to Dominic Pacyga, most of the Poles who first came to Chicago settled in five distinct parts of the city. The first of those Polish Patches, as they were colloquially referred to, was located on the Near Northwest Side. Centering on the Polish Triangle at the intersection of Milwaukee and Ashland avenues with Division street it later became known as Polish Downtown. The second large settlement, developed in Pilsen on the west side near 18th street and Ashland avenue. Poles established two separate enclaves in the Stock Yard district, one in Bridgeport, the other in the Back of the Yards near 47th street and Ashland avenue. Another Polish neighborhood developed in the area around the massive Illinois Steel works in South Chicago in the area colloquially referred to as "the Bush".

Polish communities in Chicago were often founded and organized around parishes mostly by peasant immigrants who named their neighbourhoods after them, like Bronislawowo, named after St. Bronislava.* Sometimes the neighbourhoods are contiguous so its difficult to say precisely where one ends and one begins, as in the case of 'Stanislawowo' by the church of St. Stanislaus Kostka and 'Trojcowo' by Holy Trinity Polish Mission in the former area of Polish Downtown.

Initial historical Polish patches

In Polish the ending 'owo' in e.g., Bronislawowo functions similar to English 'ville' in Johnsville or 'ton' in Charleston. When added to a name of a saint, it indicates a Polish sounding town or a village. This is a colloquial phenomenon, not present in educated Polish; however, it persists in the names of different Polish areas of Chicago.

Polish Downtown- (Pulaski Park, River West, Bucktown, Wicker Park, East Village, and Noble Square)

Trojcowo – The area around Holy Trinity Polish Mission
Stanislawowo – The area around St. Stanislaus Kostka in Chicago
Kantowo – The area around St. John Cantius in Chicago
Mlodziankowo – The area around Holy Innocents in Chicago
Fidelisowo – The area around St. Fidelis
Helenowo – The area around St. Helen
Marianowo – The area around St. Mary of the Angels in Chicago
Jadwigowo – The area around St. Hedwig's in Chicago

Lower West Side
Wojciechowo – The area around St. Adalbert's in Chicago
Annowo – The area around St. Anns in Chicago
Romanowo – The area around St. Roman's
Kazimierzowo – The area around the former St. Casimir's

Bridgeport
NMP Nieustajacej Pomocy – The area around St. Mary of Perpetual Help
Barbarowo – The area around St. Barbara in Chicago

Back of the Yards
Jozefowo – The area around St. Joseph's in Chicago
Janowo – The area around St. John of God
Sercanowo – The area around Sacred Heart

South Chicago
Niepokolanowo – The area around Immaculate Conception in Chicago
Michalowo – The area around St. Michael's in Chicago
Magdalenowo – The area around St. Mary Magdalene
Bronislawowo – The area around St. Bronislava

Subsequent historical Polish patches
Later as Poles grew in number and advanced economically, they migrated further out into outlying areas. The result was that the West Town/Logan Square settlement in Polish Downtown spread westward along North Avenue and northwestward along Milwaukee thereby creating a "Polish Corridor" which tied in contiguous areas such as Norwood Park, Jefferson Park, Portage Park, and Belmont-Cragin. The same kind of advance occurred in the other original areas of Polish settlements so that Poles from both the Lower West Side and the Back of the Yards moved into both sides of Archer Avenue, giving rise to sizable Polish settlements on the Southwest Side of the city such as McKinley Park, Garfield Ridge, Brighton Park and Archer Heights. On the far Southeast Side, the South Chicago "steel mill settlements" spilled over into Pullman, Roseland, East Side, Hegewisch and Calumet City as well as into Lake County in Northwest Indiana, where thriving Polish communities were found in North Hammond, Whiting, the Indian Harbor section of East Chicago and several neighborhoods in the newly built industrial city of Gary.

North Side of Chicago

Lincoln Park
Jozafatowo or Kaszubowo – The area around the parish of St. Josaphat's in Chicago which was initially heavily Cassubian

Lincoln Square
U Przemienienia – The area around the parish of Transfiguration

Avondale
Chicago's Polish Village:
Jackowo – The area around St. Hyacinth Basilica
Waclawowo – The area around St. Wenceslaus

Irving Park
Polskie Wille - The landmark Villa District, historically known as the "Polish Kenilworth"
Niepokalanowo/ Małe Kaszuby – The area around Immaculate Heart of Mary, also known as Little Cassubia

Portage Park
Władysławowo – The area around the parish of St. Ladislaus in Chicago

Jefferson Park
Konstancowo – The area around the parish of St. Constance

Norwood Park
Teklowo – The area around the parish of St. Thecla

Belmont Cragin
Jakubowo – The area around St. James
U Biskupa/ Biskupowo (Stanislawowo) – The area around the parish of St. Stanislaus Bishop and Martyr

Humboldt Park
Franciszkowo – The area around the parish of St. Francis of Assisi

South Side of Chicago
McKinley Park
Piotropawlowo – The area around the parish of Ss Peter and Paul

Archer Heights
Brunowo – The area around the parish St. Bruno

Garfield Ridge
Kamilowo – The area around the parish of St. Camillus by Midway Airport

Brighton Park
U Pieciu Braci – The area around Five Holy Martyrs
Pankracowo – The area around the parish of St. Pancratius

South Lawndale
U Dobrego Pasterza/ Pasterzowo – The area around the parish of Good Shepherd

West Elsdon
Turibiuszowo – The area around the parish of St. Turibius

Roseland
Salomejowo – The area around the parish of St. Salomea

Hegewisch
Florianowo – The area around the parish of St. Florian

Over the course of the city's development as the city's Polish community climbed further up the economic ladder and were followed by new waves of immigrants the concentration of Poles shifted to different areas of the city.

Religion

As in Poland, the overwhelming majority of Polish immigrants who settled in Chicago were culturally very devout Roman Catholics.  Though almost all of the Polish Americans remained loyal to the Catholic Church after immigrating, a breakaway Catholic church was founded in 1897 in Scranton, Pennsylvania. Polish parishioners founded the church to assert independence from the Catholic Church in America. The split was in rebellion from the church leadership, then dominated by Irish  and German clergy, and lacking in Polish speakers and Polish church leaders. The Bucktown campus of the former Cathedral of All Saints still stands as a testament to this community of faith.  The current Cathedral and Cemetery complex on the city's periphery by Rosemont remains active and is still independent from the authority of the Roman Catholic Church.

Poland is also home to followers of Protestantism and the Eastern Orthodox Church. Small groups of both of these groups are present Chicago. One of the most celebrated painters of religious icons in North America today is a Polish American Eastern Orthodox priest, Fr. Theodore Jurewicz, who singlehandedly painted New Gračanica Monastery in Third Lake, Illinois, over the span of three years.

While large numbers of Jews from the former lands of the Polish–Lithuanian Commonwealth immigrated to the Chicago area, they faced a historical trajectory far different from that of their Christian counterparts.  In the process of Americanization, many Polish Jews in Chicago would lose their identification with Poland, with notable exceptions. There have also been small numbers of Muslims, mostly Lipka Tatars originating from the Białystok region.

The Polish presence in Chicago today

Institutions
Chicago bills itself as the largest Polish city outside of Poland with approximately 1,900,000 people of Polish ethnicity in the Chicago metropolitan area. Chicago's Polish presence is felt in the large number of Polish American organizations located there, including the Polish Museum of America, the Polish American Association, the Polish National Alliance and the Polish Highlanders Alliance of North America. A column fragment of Wawel Castle, the onetime seat of Poland's Royalty, has been incorporated into Chicago's landmark Tribune Tower as a visual tribute to Chicago's large Polish populace.

Culture

Chicago also has a thriving Polish cultural scene. The Polish Arts Club of Chicago was founded in 1926. The city hosts the Polish Film Festival of America where various Polish films are screened during the weeklong festival every October. Polish stage productions in both Polish and English are regularly staged at numerous venues throughout the Chicago Metropolitan Area. The most prominent venues among these are the Chopin and Gateway Theatres. The Gateway, which is also the seat of the Polish Cultural Center in Chicago is the home of the Paderewski Symphony Orchestra. The Lira Ensemble, the only professional performing arts company outside of Poland that specializes in Polish music, song, and dance is Artist-in-Residence at Loyola University Chicago. Chicago is also host to several Polish folk dances ensembles that teach traditions to Polish-American children.

Chicago celebrates its Polish Heritage every Labor Day weekend at the Taste of Polonia Festival in Jefferson Park, attended by such political notables as President George H. W. Bush, Dick Cheney, Newt Gingrich, Hadassah Lieberman, Congresswoman Melissa Bean, and Tipper Gore. Illinois, due to the influence of this large population, is also one of the few states that celebrates Casimir Pulaski Day. Some schools and government services in the metro area are closed for the holiday.

The Almanac of American Politics 2004 states that "Even today, in Archer Heights [a neighborhood of Chicago], you can scarcely go a block without hearing someone speaking Polish". This may be anachronistic because, although once true, today the Archer Heights neighborhood is predominately Mexican-American and Mexican, with many of the Polish former residents having died or moved to the suburbs.  This is reflected in many of the businesses which served the Polish community having been replaced with businesses which serve the Mexican community.  Polish-language business signs, once ubiquitous in Archer Heights, are now quite rare, while Spanish-language signs are seen on many businesses in the area.

Much of 1950s Chicago Polish youth culture was captured in the 1972 musical Grease, in which the majority of characters had Polish surnames (Zuko, Dumbrowski, Kenickie); Jim Jacobs, who conceived Grease, based the musical on his real-life experiences in a Chicago high school. Much of the Polish-American nature of the musical was discarded when Grease was made into a feature film in 1978, casting non-Polish actors in the lead roles, and subsequent productions have also followed the film's lead in toning down the Chicago Polish influences.

Ponglish

Some  of Chicago Polonia (the Polish term for members of the expatriate Polish community) speak the American sub dialect of Ponglish (usually referred to as Chicagowski by local Poles) a fusion of the Polish and English languages. Ponglish is a common (to greater or lesser degree, almost unavoidable) phenomenon among persons bilingual in Polish and English, and its avoidance requires considerable effort and attention. Ponglish is a manifestation of a broader phenomenon, that of language interference.

Notable persons

Actors, singers, and directors
 Stanley Andrews, born Stanley Andrzejewski, an American actor who played the voice of Daddy Warbucks on the radio program Little Orphan Annie
 Carlos Bernard, born Carlos Bernard Papierski, an American actor and director, best known for his role as Tony Almeida in 24
 Casey and Nina Siemaszko – American actors

Writers and authors
 Stuart Dybek – writer of fiction and poetry
 John Guzlowski – author

Businessmen and entrepreneurs
 John S. Flizikowski – architect of residential, church, and commercial buildings during the late 19th and early 20th centuries
 Paul Bragiel – Silicon Valley entrepreneur & venture capitalist, Colombia national team cross country skier

Musicians and composers
 Jack Benny, born Benjamin Kubelsky, American comedian, vaudevillian, radio, television and film actor, and violinist
 Walter Jagiello - polka musician known as L'il Wally who was one of the first two inductees into the International Polka Association Polka Hall of Fame. 
 Feliks Konarski – poet, songwriter, and cabaret performer
 Krzysztof Klenczon – singer and songwriter and member of the group Czerwone Gitary
 Ray Manzarek – keyboardist of The Doors
 Artur Rodziński conductor of opera and symphonic music
Flora Zygman – pianist, music educator

Clergy
 Vincent Barzynski – Roman Catholic priest and organizer

Painters, sculptors, and artists
 Jerzy Kenar – sculptor 
 Richard Nickel – architectural photographer and historical preservationist
 Ed Paschke – painter
 Mary Stanisia – American Catholic artist and painter
 John J. Szaton – sculptor
 Stanisław Szukalski – painter and sculptor
 Katarzyna Mecinski (also known as Fifty na Pol) - YouTube vlogger

Government officials and politicians
 Andrzej Czuma – politician, lawyer and historian, an activist of the Polish anti-Communist opposition in the Polish People's Republic
 Peter Kiołbassa (1837–1905) Democratic politician in the City of Chicago who helped organize St. Stanislaus Kostka parish
 John Kluczynski – U.S. Representative representing Illinois's 5th congressional district
 Robert Martwick – Democratic member of the Illinois House of Representatives
 Roman Conrad Pucinski – Democratic Party Politician and U.S. Representative
 Daniel David "Dan" Rostenkowski – United States Representative and Chairman of the House Ways and Means Committee
 John Francis Smulski American politician and businessman.

Scholars
 Oskar Lange – economist and diplomat
 Marta Ptaszynska – University of Chicago professor

Sports
 Krzysztof Hausner – football right-wing forward, most notable for his performances for Cracovia Krakow
 Mike Krzyzewski – Basketball coach
 Al Piechota – Professional baseball player whose career spanned 15 seasons

Criminals
 Ted Kaczynski – Evergreen Park math professor and terrorist
 Tillie Klimek –  serial killer
 Steven Kazmierczak – Northern Illinois University shooting of February 14, 2008
 John Wayne Gacy – serial killer
 Wanda Stopa – murderer and lawyer

See also

 Diaspora politics in the United States
 Felician Sisters
 Polish Cathedral style churches
 Polish Constitution Day Parade
 Polish Falcons
 Polish Roman Catholic Union of America
Fourth Partition, a 2013 documentary film

References

Further reading
 Erdmans, Mary Patrice. Opposite Poles: Immigrants and Ethnics in Polish Chicago, 1976-1990. Penn State University Press, 1998.

External links

 Former President of Poland Lech Walesa speaking on the role of Poles in Chicago in the end of communism in Poland
 Polish Localizer Polsort – Polish Businesses and Organizations in Chicago
 Current Polish patches: Polish Masses in Chicago Area provided by Polsort

 
Ethnic groups in Chicago
History of Chicago
Polish communities in the United States